In enzymology, a 1,3-beta-D-glucan phosphorylase is an enzyme that catalyzes the chemical reaction

(1,3-beta-D-glucosyl)n + phosphate  (1,3-beta-D-glucosyl)n-1 + alpha-D-glucose 1-phosphate

Thus, the two substrates of this enzyme are (1,3-beta-D-glucosyl)n and phosphate, whereas its two products are (1,3-beta-D-glucosyl)n-1 and alpha-D-glucose 1-phosphate.

This enzyme belongs to the family of glycosyltransferases, specifically the hexosyltransferases.  The systematic name of this enzyme class is 1,3-beta-D-glucan:phosphate alpha-D-glucosyltransferase. Other names in common use include laminarin phosphoryltransferase, 1,3-beta-D-glucan:orthophosphate glucosyltransferase, and laminarin phosphoryltransferase.

References

Gene Ontology (GO) codes

EC 2.4.1
Enzymes of unknown structure